Kafr Naya is a town in northern Aleppo Governorate, northwestern Syria. Located north of Aleppo, the town is administratively part of Nahiya Tell Rifaat in A'zaz District. Nearby localities include Mayer to the southwest. In the 2004 census, Kafr Naya had a population of 5,647.

Syrian Civil War

Kafr Naya was captured by the Syrian Democratic Forces on 15 February 2016,   bringing it into the Autonomous Administration of North and East Syria.

References

 

Populated places in Azaz District